The Jewish-English singer-songwriter Amy Winehouse recorded songs intended for over four albums,  two of which were released prior to her death, one of which released posthumously, and one left unreleased. Some tracks have since remained unpublished and their existence is only known through word-of-mouth or bootleg publication. Disregarding live recordings, Winehouse is known to have over 40 released tracks alongside over a dozen unreleased.

List of songs

References

 
Winehouse, Amy